Ghulam Sarwar is a Bangladeshi-born British writer on Islam in English and director of the Muslim Educational Trust (MET).

Biography
Sarwar was born in the Bengal Presidency (now Bangladesh), British India. He graduated with honours in commerce from the Government College of Commerce, Chittagong and also received his Master of Business and Management from the University of Dhaka.

Sarwar is director of the Muslim Educational Trust (MET), which the Charity Commission for England and Wales describes as, "An educational charity devoted to the catering for the educational needs of Muslims and their children in the UK".

Works
Ed Husain writes that when he was a juvenile, Sarwar's Islam: Beliefs and Teachings was used in religious education classes in Britain, and that as of 2007 it continued to be used as an introductory text in schools, mosques and Muslim homes there.

His other written works include:
 Islam for Younger People. (1981) Muslim Educational Trust. 
 The Children’s Book of Salah. Muslim Educational Trust. 
 British Muslims and Schools. Muslim Educational Trust. 
 Sex Education: The Muslim Perspective. Muslim Educational Trust. 
 Syllabus and Guidelines for Islamic Teaching. Muslim Educational Trust. 
 Muslims and Education in the UK. Muslim Educational Trust.

See also
 British Bangladeshi
 List of British Bangladeshis

References

External links
 Official MET website
 Official MET Biography
 Bangladesh woman reporter feted. BBC News. 26 October 2005

1945 births
Living people
Bangladeshi Muslims
British Muslims
Bangladeshi emigrants to England
British people of Bangladeshi descent
English Sunni Muslim scholars of Islam
British Asian writers